The Order of Wearing of Australian honours includes Imperial honours (those of the British Empire/United Kingdom) if they were awarded prior to 6 October 1992. Imperial honours awarded after 5 October 1992 are considered foreign.

For the Order of Wearing of Australian honours excluding Imperial honours, see Australian Honours Order of Wearing.

Order of Wearing 

Honours and Awards listed in bold print are:
 those within the Australian System of Honours and Awards;
 those conferred by The Sovereign in exercise of the Royal Prerogative;
 those within the Order of St John; and
 foreign awards, the acceptance and wearing of which have been authorised by the Governor-General.

Honours and Awards listed in unbolded print and marked with * are Imperial awards and are considered Australian if conferred prior to 6 October 1992. If conferred after 5 October 1992, Imperial awards are foreign and should be worn accordingly.

  Victoria Cross/Victoria Cross for Australia VC
  George Cross* GC
  Cross of Valour CV
  Knight/Lady Companion of the Order of the Garter KG/LG
  Knight/Lady Companion of the Order of the Thistle KT/LT
  Knight/Dame Grand Cross of the Order of the Bath* GCB
  Member of the Order of Merit OM (Civil Division and Military Division)
  Knight/Dame of the Order of Australia AK/AD
  Knight/Dame Grand Cross of the Order of St Michael and St George* GCMG
  Knight/Dame Grand Cross of the Royal Victorian Order GCVO
  Knight/Dame Grand Cross of the Order of the British Empire (Civil Division)* GBE  (Military Division)*
  Companion of the Order of Australia (General Division) AC   (Military Division)
  Companion of the Order of the Companions of Honour* CH
  Knight/Dame Commander of the Order of the Bath* KCB/DCB
  Knight/Dame Commander of the Order of St Michael and St George* KCMG/DCMG
  Knight/Dame Commander of the Royal Victorian Order KCVO/DCVO
  Knight/Dame Commander of the Order of the British Empire* KBE/DBE  (Military Division)*
  Knight Bachelor* (Confers the title of "Sir" with no postnominals.)
  Officer of the Order of Australia (General Division) AO   (Military Division)
  Companion of the Order of the Bath* CB
  Companion of the Order of St Michael and St George* CMG
  Commander of the Royal Victorian Order CVO
  Commander of the Order of the British Empire* CBE  (Military Division)*
  Star of Gallantry SG
  Star of Courage SC
  Companion of the Distinguished Service Order* DSO
  Distinguished Service Cross DSC
  Member of the Order of Australia (General Division) AM   (Military Division)
  Lieutenant of the Royal Victorian Order LVO
  Officer of the Order of the British Empire* OBE  (Military Division)*
  Companion of the Imperial Service Order* ISO
  Member of the Royal Victorian Order MVO
  Member of the Order of the British Empire* MBE  (Military Division)*
  Conspicuous Service Cross CSC
  Nursing Service Cross NSC
  Royal Red Cross (1st Class – Member)* RRC
  Distinguished Service Cross* DSC (Imperial)
  Military Cross* MC
  Distinguished Flying Cross* DFC
  Air Force Cross* AFC
  Royal Red Cross (2nd Class – Associate)* ARRC
  Medal for Gallantry MG
  Bravery Medal BM
  Distinguished Service Medal DSM
  Public Service Medal PSM
  Australian Police Medal APM
  Australian Fire Service Medal AFSM
  Ambulance Service Medal ASM
  Emergency Services Medal ESM
  Australian Corrections Medal ACM
  Medal of the Order of Australia (General Division) OAM   (Military Division)
  Order of St John
  Distinguished Conduct Medal* DCM
  Conspicuous Gallantry Medal* CGM 
  George Medal* GM
  Conspicuous Service Medal CSM
  Australian Antarctic Medal AAM
  King’s Police Medal for Gallantry* KPM
  King’s Fire Service Medal for Gallantry* KFSM
  Distinguished Service Medal* DSM (Imperial)
  Military Medal* MM
  Distinguished Flying Medal* DFM
  Air Force Medal* AFM
  Sea Gallantry Medal* SGM
  Queen’s Gallantry Medal* QGM
  Royal Victorian Medal RVM
  British Empire Medal* BEM  (Military Division)*
  King’s Police Medal for Distinguished Service* KPM
  King’s Fire Service Medal for Distinguished Service* KFSM
  Commendation for Gallantry
  Commendation for Brave Conduct
  Queen’s Commendation for Brave Conduct*
  Commendation for Distinguished Service

 War medals, campaign medals, active service medals and service medals (See Australian campaign medals)

  Police Overseas Service Medal
  Humanitarian Overseas Service Medal
  National Emergency Medal
  Civilian Service Medal 1939–1945
  National Police Service Medal
  Polar Medal*
  Imperial Service Medal*
  King Edward VII Coronation Medal (1902)
  King George V Coronation Medal (1911)
  King George V Silver Jubilee Medal (1935)
  King George VI Coronation Medal (1937)
  Queen Elizabeth II Coronation Medal (1953)
  Queen Elizabeth II Silver Jubilee Medal (1977)
 Queen Elizabeth II Golden Jubilee Medal (2002)
 Queen Elizabeth II Diamond Jubilee Medal (2012)
  Defence Force Service Medal
  Reserve Force Decoration RFD
  Reserve Force Medal
  Defence Long Service Medal
  National Medal
  Australian Defence Medal
  Australian Cadet Forces Service Medal
  Champion Shots Medal
 Long Service Medals (Includes Imperial efficiency and long service awards.)
  Service Medal of the Order of St John
  Anniversary of National Service 1951–1972 Medal
 Independence and Anniversary Medals* (in order of date of receipt)
 Foreign Awards (in order of date of authorisation of their acceptance and wearing). (See Foreign Campaign Medals)

See also 
 Orders, decorations, and medals of Australia
 Post-nominal letters
 List of post-nominal letters (Australia)
 Australian Commendations

References

External links 
 It's an Honour – Australian government website
 Wearing Awards – Australian government website
 Defence Honours & Awards – Australian Defence Force website

 

Honours, Order of Wearing
Orders, decorations, and medals of Australia